Ann Cleare (born 1983 in County Offaly) is an Irish composer. She is Assistant Professor at Trinity College Dublin. In 2019 she won the prestigious Ernst von Siemens Composers' Prize, sharing it with Annesley Black and Mithatcan Öcal.

Education
Cleare studied with John Godfrey and Jesse Ronneau at University College Cork, where she was awarded an MPhil. She later studied at IRCAM in Paris and went on to complete her PhD in composition with Chaya Czernowin and Hans Tutschku at Harvard University.

On magnetic fields
Her 2011–2012 work, on magnetic fields, was commissioned by the Wittener Tage für neue Kammermusik and premiered by the Collegium Novum Zürich. This work, which separates the performers into three chamber ensembles, uses two violin soloists as a kind of sculpted "electric current" to propel the interaction between the musicians.

She later created a version of the piece for two violins and loudspeaker which was premiered by the Riot Ensemble in London on 14 May 2018. In an interview with Tim Rutherford-Johnson, Cleare described the work:At the centre of two of the spatially divided chamber groups lies a solo violin. I think of both solo violins as "electric currents", wiry voices that magnetically charge the electricity of the ensemble that surrounds them, wrapping layers of various sonic materials around the violins, providing what I think of as an electric cloud for the evolving violin electricities to speak from.

Eöl
In 2015, MATA Festival commissioned Cleare to write a piece for the Talea Ensemble, and she wrote Eöl for a collection of small percussion instruments surrounded by a small ensemble. The percussion instruments are all made with different metals in order to make use of their varied timbral characteristics. In an interview, Cleare said,In a geological sense, the word "eolian" signifies something borne, deposited, produced or eroded by the wind. This particularly connects to the porous role that the accordion plays in the piece. It is like a medium that the other instruments of the ensemble transform and interact through. And in a mythical sense, the title alludes to Eöl, an elf from J. R. R. Tolkien's Middle Earth writings, who skillfully wove metals into various magical armors. The ensemble enacts a similar type of sonic weaving, leading to the formation of the percussionist's metallic hands.

Portrait concert
On 1 March 2018, the International Contemporary Ensemble presented a portrait concert of Cleare's work at Miller Theater, including her works teeth of light, tongue of waves (a world premiere and a co-commission by the ensemble and the theatre), to another of that other, the square of yellow light that is your window and Dorchadas.

Awards
 2006: College Scholar from University College Cork for achievement and excellence in academic studies
 2010: Shortlisted for the Gaudeamus Prize, Holland
 2012: Derek C. Bok Excellence in Teaching Award, Harvard University
 2012: Named one of NPR's top composers under 40, WQXR, New York
 June 2013: Staubach Honorarium recipient from IMD (Darmstadt Music Courses), Germany
 February 2019: Ernst von Siemens Composers' Prize
 October 2019: Honorary Doctorate from the National University of Ireland

Solo portrait concerts
 March 2018: Miller Theatre, Columbia University, with The International Contemporary Ensemble
 October 2019: Musikfabrik, Cologne
 November 2019: Riot Ensemble, Huddersfield Contemporary Music Festival, UK; broadcast on BBC Radio 3

Outstanding commissions and performances
 April 2015: Recipient of MATA Commission for 2015 Festival, one of three composers chosen from over 950 applications
 April 2020: International Society for Contemporary Music – work selected from International Call for New Zealand Festival 2020

Selected works

Orchestra
 eyam v (woven) for contrabass flute, contrabass clarinet, and orchestra (2015–17)
 phôsphors (...of ether) for orchestra (2012/13)
 to another of that other for trumpet, trombone, clarinet and orchestra (2009/13)
 Claustrophobia – Four Movements for String Orchestra (2005–2006)

Opera
 One Here Now: A Sonic Theatre for voices, percussion, and electronics (2017/18)
 rinn, a chamber opera for two actors, three singers, large ensemble, and electronic sculpture/staging (2014–16)

Chamber music
 teeth of light, tongue of waves for soprano and bassoon with bowed guitar, viola, cello, and double bass (2017/18)
 fiáin for violin, viola, cello, electric guitar, and electric bass guitar (2017)
 93 million miles away for violin, cello, and piano (2016)
 eyam ii (taking apart your universe) for contrabass clarinet solo and  ensemble (2009–2016) 
 ore for one high reed wind instrument (clarinet/oboe/saxophone) and string trio (2016)
 eöl for percussion solo with clarinet, saxophone, accordion, cello and double bass (2014/15)
 luna|lithe|lair for bfl, bcl, ca, asax, pno, perc, vln, vla, vc (2013/14)
 I should live in wires for leaving you behind for 2 pianists (1 piano) and 2 percussionists (2014)
 anchor me to the land for small ensemble (2014)
 the square of yellow light that is your window for a.sax (solo), perc, pf, e.gt (2013/14)
 eyam iii (if it’s living somewhere outside of you) for solo bass flute shadowed by one low wind instrument and one string instrument (2013/15)
 mire|…|veins for brass quintet (2013)
 to another of that other for trumpet, trombone, clarinet (2009–13)
 on magnetic fields for two violins and one loudspeaker (2011–2012)
 on magnetic fields for ensemble (2011–2012)
 of violet ether for ensemble (2011)
 moil for string quartet (2010)
 unable to create an offscreen world (c) for picc, perc, bcl, vln, vc (2010)
 unable to create an offscreen world (b) for piccolo and percussion (2010)
 Inner for cello/viola/violin and piano (2009)
 To Exist, Press the Green Button for picc/afl, cl, bcl, b.tbn, cymbal, vc, db (2009)
 Dysmorphia for viola and cello (2008)
 The Apophenia Transmissions for wind quintet (2008)
 Dorchadas for bfl, bcl, bsn, tbn, perc, pf, vla, vc, db (2007)
 Aspira for large wind and brass ensemble (2007)
 Day Two for violin, cello, piano (2006)

Solo instrumental
 where cobalt waves live for solo piano (2017)
 luna (the eye that opens the other eye) for alto saxophone solo (2013/14)
 eyam iii (if it’s living somewhere outside of you) for solo bass flute (2013)
 eyam i (it takes an ocean not to) for B clarinet solo (2009–13)
 IRK for viola/violin with optional electronics (2006)

References

External links
Official website
Interview on classical lite
Articles in Irish Times
BBC listings
Listing in the New Yorker

1983 births
21st-century classical composers
21st-century women composers
Academics of the University of York
Academics of Trinity College Dublin
Alumni of University College Cork
Ernst von Siemens Composers' Prize winners
Harvard University alumni
Irish classical composers
Irish women classical composers
Living people
Musicians from County Offaly